The 1982 Nice International Open was a men's tennis tournament played on outdoor clay courts at the Nice Lawn Tennis Club in Nice, France, and was part of the 1982 Volvo Grand Prix. It was the 11th edition of the tournament and was held from 29 March until 4 April 1982. Second-seeded Balázs Taróczy won the singles title.

Finals

Singles
 Balázs Taróczy defeated  Yannick Noah 6–2, 3–6, 13–11
 It was Taróczy's first singles title of the year and the fifth of his career.

Doubles
 Yannick Noah /  Henri Leconte defeated  Paul McNamee /  Balázs Taróczy 5–7, 6–4, 6–3

References

External links
 ITF tournament edition details

Nice International Open
1982
Nice International Open
Nice International Open
Nice International Open
20th century in Nice